Mikesville refers to places in the United States:

Mikesville, Florida, unincorporated community
Mikesville, Wisconsin, unincorporated community